Sofía Lisa Zámolo (born 21 March 1983) is an Argentine model, actress and television presenter.

Biography 
Sofía Lisa Zámolo was born on March 21, 1983, in San Isidro, Buenos Aires, Argentina. She is the daughter of Diether Zámolo, a lawyer and Cristina Guerrero, a travel agent. She has one sister and two brothers. Sofía Zámolo study in the Colegio Carmen Arriola de Marín.

Personal life 
On November 24, 2016, she married in a civil ceremony with José Félix Uriburu, a businessman. On November 25, 2016, the party was held in Closed Neighborhood Santa Catalina Puerta 1 in Tigre Partido. On December 9, 2016, she got married in a religious ceremony with José Félix Uriburu in the church of José Ignacio in Punta del Este, Uruguay. On October 29, 2020, California Uriburu Zámolo was born by Caesarean section.

Career

Modeling career 
Sofía Zámolo started working as an advertising and runway model at age 16, when a friend of her dad's introduced her to an agency.

Sofía Zámolo became famous in 2001 thanks to the Revista Gente where she made the cover La Rubia y la Morocha with Karina Jelinek. Thanks to the cover of the Revista Gente, Sofía works in Argentina, Chile, Paraguay, Peru, Dominican Republic, Miami, Madrid, Paris and Uruguay. She carried out dozens of campaigns for various Argentine and Latin American clothing, lingerie, shoe and beauty brands.

In 2005 she was the face of Nueva Campaña Kaury.

In 2008, she carried out the autumn/winter 2008 campaign for the Sweet Jeans clothing brand and was the protagonist of the Brahma Paraguay 2008 Calendar.

In 2010 she was the face of L'Oréal when this brand organized an event in the city of Rosario, Santa Fe.

Sofía has been the cover of numerous Latin American magazines.

Television career 
In 2007, Sofía traveled to Mexico to the Yucatán Peninsula to host the fashion and design event La flor más bella. Sofía debuted in the theater in the play Pa'que tengan in Villa Carlos Paz.

In 2008 she participated in the Bailando por un Sueño 2008.

In 2009, she makes a small participation in the youth television series Niní.

In 2010 she debuted as a host in Plan Belleza. In 2010 she participated in the Bailando 2010.

In 2011 she was summoned by Marcelo Tinelli to host the program  La cocina del show with Mariano Iudica. In 2011 she participated in the Cantando 2011.

Filmography

Television

Television Programs

Theater

Videoclips

References

Argentine female models
1983 births
Living people
21st-century Argentine women
Participants in Argentine reality television series
Bailando por un Sueño (Argentine TV series) participants